Beare Sound (variant: Beares Sound) is an Arctic waterway in Qikiqtaaluk, Nunavut, Canada. It is located in eastern Frobisher Bay off the southern tip of Baffin Island's Blunt Peninsula.

Martin Frobisher named the sound after James Beare, principal surveyor of the 1577/78 Frobisher expedition.

References 

Sounds of Qikiqtaaluk Region
Bodies of water of Baffin Bay